The Canberra Vikings, formerly the Canberra Kookaburras, is an Australian rugby union football team that competes in the National Rugby Championship (NRC). The team is based at Viking Park in Wanniassa, and is backed by the Tuggeranong Vikings Group as the licence holder, with the Brumbies and University of Canberra as non-financial partners.

The coaching and training programs used by the Brumbies for Super Rugby are extended to players joining the NRC team from the Brumbies, the local ACTRU Premier Division club competition, and the ACT and Southern NSW Rugby Union catchment area.

The present NRC team is descended from the ACT representative side known as the Canberra Kookaburras. That name was adopted by the Canberra Kookaburra Rugby Club for the ACT Rugby Union's entry into the NSW Premiership in 1995. Ownership of the Kookaburras was transferred to the Tuggeranong Vikings RUC for the 1999 season and the team was renamed the Canberra Vikings.

The Vikings played in the QRU Premiership (2001 to 2003, winning three titles), Tooheys New Cup (2004 and 2005) and Australian Rugby Shield (winning in 2006), before entering the Australian Rugby Championship (2007). That competition did not continue after the inaugural season and the Canberra Vikings team was disbanded at the end of 2007. After a six-year absence, the team was revived as the University of Canberra Vikings for the national competition relaunch as the NRC in 2014.

History
The late 19th century was when rugby began to be played in the region around what is now Canberra. Goulburn Rugby Union Club became a founding member of the Southern Rugby Union in 1874, and Queanbeyan played Yass in 1878. Teams from Hall and the Royal Military College, Duntroon played rugby union matches prior to the First World War. The Federal Capital Territory Rugby Union was established and re-established several times in the 1920s and 30s, before the First Grade competition was finally started in 1938 with four clubs playing in the inaugural season.

ACT representative team
The Territory's representative team hosted the All Blacks at Manuka Oval in the winter of 1938. The Canberra side managed to score a try before the interval and trailed the visitors at half time by 24–5 before the New Zealanders went on to win by 57–5. Coached by Frank O'Rourke, the home team had played its inaugural match only three months earlier.

The team's original strip featured an all gold jersey with two green bands. They defeated the Hawkesbury College at the Country Carnival earlier in 1938, and later that season won against the Bathurst side. Three players from the Territory team were selected for NSW Combined Country to play Sydney that year. The Australian Capital Territory team, often referred to simply as "Canberra", grew in stature in the decades following the Second World War. ACT won the Caldwell Cup for the Country Championship for the first time in 1964 and retained it for the following two seasons.

Rugby in Canberra came of age in the 1970s. ACT scored a 17–11 away win over Queensland in 1972, and then had their first win over a national side, defeating Tonga by 17–6 in 1973. In 1975, ACT won promotion for the following season to the top division of the Wallaby Trophy, Australia's provincial championship at that time. The triumph was short-lived, however, because the planned tournament for 1976 was officially cancelled.

When Wales toured Australia in 1978, the ACT defeated them in a rousing 21–20 come-from-behind victory. The win over the reigning Five Nations champions showed that ACT could compete against the top tier of rugby players in the world.

The name "Canberra Kookaburras" was used for the ACT representative team from 1989, but it was to be a further five years before the Canberra Kookaburra club was officially founded. When the ACT comprehensively beat New South Wales by 44–28 in 1994, an invitation was issued for a Canberra club to play in the expanded 14-team NSWRU Premiership sponsored by AAMI for the following season.

Canberra Kookaburras: AAMI Cup

The ACT Rugby Union formed the Canberra Kookaburra Rugby Club in August 1994, with Tuggeranong Vikings RUC as underwriter. For the 1995 AAMI Cup, the Canberra Kookaburras played their home games at Manuka Oval and had to travel to Sydney on most other weekends. The club fielded teams in first grade, reserve grade and colts. The Canberra Kookaburras played in a white and black strip, separated by bands of blue and gold (ACT's traditional colours) around the centre of the jersey. White and black were the colours of the first Canberra team formed in 1927.

Canberra's reserve grade team won their grand final in the first season. The first grade team, coached by Geoff Stokes, also made the grand final in their first season but lost to Gordon by 24–11 to finish as runner-up in 1995. The advent of the ACT Brumbies and Super 12 in 1996 affected the Kookaburras' playing strength, with only one man from the previous grand final team available for the start of the 1996 season. Canberra were placed fifth in the regular season that year, and lost to Randwick in the elimination final.

The Kookaburras were coached by Kim Thurbon in 1997, and by Ian Snook in 1998. The first grade team did not make the finals in either year. Travelling had caused a heavy financial drain on the club by 1998. Ownership of the Canberra Kookaburras was transferred to Tuggerannong Vikings RUC in 1998 and the team's name was changed to Canberra Vikings for the 1999 season.

Canberra Vikings

The Canberra Vikings adopted the red and white colours of Tuggeranong Vikings RUC with black detailing on the jersey and black shorts.

NSW Premiership 
Ian Snook was retained as the team's first grade coach after the club's changeover of colours and name to the Canberra Vikings. The NSW Premiership was sponsored as the Citibank MasterCard Cup in 1999, and Canberra just missed out on making the finals. Despite the Vikings playing in the semi-finals in 2000, both Canberra and Newcastle were dropped from the competition for the 2001 season. The Vikings then made arrangements to play in Queensland.

Queensland Premiership
The Canberra Vikings played in the QRU's Premiership from 2001 to 2003 and won the grand final each year to take three consecutive titles. Canberra's entry increased the number of clubs from nine to ten and brought an added professionalism to the competition that was sponsored as the XXXX Premiership in 2001. With Terry Burkett as coach, the Vikings finished second in the 18-round regular season behind GPS Old Boys, but comfortably beat the Gold Coast Breakers by 32–10 in the grand final to win the Hospitals Cup.

The Queensland Premier Rugby competition was introduced in 2002, using additional funding from an ARU program to strengthen the top tier of Australian clubs in a transition to semi-pro rugby. Played in the second half of the season to allow Super 12 players to compete, the Premier Rugby competition spanned nine rounds followed by a finals series for the Hospitals Cup. For the first half of the season the clubs played for the Welsby Cup, which was won by Sunnybank in 2002.

Laurie Fisher stepped up from the assistant coaching role the previous season to become the Vikings' head coach and his team took out the double in the 2002 Premier Rugby competition. The Vikings won the minor premiership with an 8–1 season before defeating Easts Tigers in the grand final, avenging a regular round loss to the Tigers with a 45–3 win. Fisher was the head coach again in 2003 when Canberra finished second behind University of Queensland in the minor premiership, but his team went on to beat the Gold Coast Breakers in the grand final by 29–16 to win their third title in a row.

NSW Premiership: Tooheys New Cup 
After nine seasons of Canberra teams playing in interstate competitions, the Vikings' relations with the premier clubs in Sydney and Brisbane had become strained. This was reportedly due to a view that the Vikings were being given the opportunity every week of poaching talented young players and that the team was being run as a shadow ACT Brumbies development side. Nevertheless, possibly due to the ARU's intervention, Canberra was granted approval to play in Sydney or Brisbane for 2004. The Vikings took the option closer to home and went to Sydney for their tenth season on the road.

Nick Scrivener was the coach of the Canberra Vikings in the Tooheys New Cup for 2004. He led the team to a qualifying final after they had finished fourth in the regular season and won seven matches from twelve. The Vikings lost to Sydney University in the qualifier by 44–14. In 2005, the team was coached by John Ross. He also guided the side to seven wins from twelve matches in the regular season, but the Vikings finished sixth that year and did not play in the finals. Canberra was kicked out of the NSW Premiership for a second time ahead of the 2006 season, ostensibly to streamline the Sydney competition and allow the NSWRU to make more room in their calendar for the proposed Australian Provincial Championship.

Australian Rugby Shield 
The Vikings entered the Australian Rugby Shield in 2006, playing as the "ACT & Southern NSW Vikings" following the renaming of the ACT Rugby Union after its expansion into Southern New South Wales the previous season. The team had two close matches against NSW Country and Perth Gold during the season, but managed to progress undefeated through the three pool games, semi-final and final to win the competition and take the shield. The Vikings played the Melbourne Axemen in the grand final at Viking Park and never looked back after the third minute when inside centre Josh Staniforth scored the first of the side's five tries for the match in a 36–10 win.

Australian Rugby Championship 
The Canberra Vikings played in the Australian Rugby Championship, known as the ARC, in 2007. Nick Scrivener returned as coach. The Vikings failed to progress beyond the robin-round stages after just three wins from eight matches; 17–8 against Perth Spirit, 53–8 over the Ballymore Tornadoes and a 29–6 win away against Sydney Fleet. The ARC was terminated at the end of 2007 after only one season of competition, with the Australian Rugby Union citing higher costs than budgeted and further projected financial losses. The Canberra Vikings team was disbanded with the end of the ARC competition.

National Rugby Championship 

In late 2013, the ARU announced the national competition would be relaunched as the National Rugby Championship in 2014. The expressions of interest were open to all parties and tenders were finalised in early 2014. A three-way partnership between the Brumbies, Tuggeranong Vikings and University of Canberra was granted a licence for a revived Canberra Vikings team, named as the University of Canberra Vikings.

Dan McKellar was appointed as head coach for 2014, and the University of Canberra Vikings (UC Vikings) played their home matches at Viking Park. The team finished sixth in the regular season and did not compete in the finals.

Prior to the 2016 NRC season, the Brumbies chief executive, Michael Jones, had suggested that the "Canberra Kookaburras" name might be reinstated. Reverting to the ACT's traditional blue and gold colours was also canvassed, but it was likely that a voting process would be used for any change. A decision was postponed due to financial considerations until 2017, when the plan was revoked after the Vikings Group took sole ownership of the team licence. However, the team adopted a heritage-style blue, gold, black and white jersey for their first game of the season in 2017, coinciding with a Kookaburras team reunion as part of the NRC's heritage round.

Stadium
The Vikings currently play at Viking Park. Many rugby union matches have been played at the stadium including two women's tests for Australia against New Zealand.

In the 2007 Australian Rugby Championship, the Canberra Vikings played at two locations; Manuka Oval and Canberra Stadium. Manuka Oval was constructed in 1929 and hosts the annual Prime Minister's XI cricket match, as well as senior club AFL and cricket. Originally Manuka Oval was not just a cricket ground, but was also used for international rugby matches, mainly between a Canberra team and the touring international side. Canberra Stadium (originally Bruce Stadium) was constructed in 1977 and is the home of the ACT Brumbies and Canberra Raiders.

Current squad
The squad for the 2019 NRC season:

Records

Honours
National Rugby Championship
Runner-up: 2015, 2017
Playoff appearance: 2018
Australian Rugby Shield
Winner: 2006
Queensland Premiership
Winner: 2001, 2002, 2003
New South Wales Premiership
Runner-up: 1995  (as Canberra Kookaburras)

Season standings
National Rugby Championship
{| class="wikitable" style="text-align:center;"
|- border=1 cellpadding=5 cellspacing=0
! style="width:20px;"|Year
! style="width:20px;"|Pos
! style="width:20px;"|Pld
! style="width:20px;"|W
! style="width:20px;"|D
! style="width:20px;"|L
! style="width:20px;"|F
! style="width:20px;"|A
! style="width:25px;"|+/-
! style="width:20px;"|BP
! style="width:20px;"|Pts
! style="width:25em; text-align:left;"|  Play-offs
|-
|2018
|4th
| 7 || 5 || 0 || 2 || 221 || 169 || +52 || 2 || 22
|align=left|  Semi-final loss to Fijian Drua by 35–28
|-
|2017
|1st
| 8 || 6 || 0 || 2 || 353 || 186 ||+167 || 5 || 29
|-
|2016
|5th
| 7 || 3 || 0 || 4 || 254 || 276 || −22 || 3 || 15
|align=left|  Did not compete
|-
|2015
|2nd
| 8 || 7 || 0 || 1 || 375 || 176 ||+199 || 7 || 35
|-
|2014
|6th
| 8 || 2 || 2 || 4 || 210 || 238 || −28  || 2 || 14
|align=left|  Did not compete
|}

Australian Rugby Championship
{| class="wikitable" style="text-align:center;"
|- border=1 cellpadding=5 cellspacing=0
! style="width:20px;"|Year
! style="width:20px;"|Pos
! style="width:20px;"|Pld
! style="width:20px;"|W
! style="width:20px;"|D
! style="width:20px;"|L
! style="width:20px;"|F
! style="width:20px;"|A
! style="width:25px;"|+/-
! style="width:20px;"|BP
! style="width:20px;"|Pts
! style="width:25em; text-align:left;"|  Play-offs
|-
|2007
|6th
| 8 || 3 || 0 || 5 || 217 || 191 ||+26 || 7 || 19
|align=left|  Did not compete
|}

Head coaches
 Nick Scrivener (2018–present)
 Tim Sampson (2017)
 Wayne Southwell (2016)
 Brad Harris (2015)
 Dan McKellar (2014)
 Nick Scrivener (2007)
 Tom Morrison (2006)
 John Ross (2005)
 Nick Scrivener (2004)
 Laurie Fisher (2002–2003)
 Terry Burkett (2001)
 Ian Snook (1998–2000)
 Kim Thurbon (1997)
 Geoff Stokes (1995–1996)

Captains
 Darcy Swain 2019
 Ben Hyne 2018
 Tom Cusack 2017
 Jarrad Butler (2015–2016)
 Fotu Auelua (2014)
 Alister Campbell (2007)

Squads
{| class="collapsible collapsed" style=" width: 100%; margin: 0px; border: 1px solid darkgray; border-spacing: 3px;"
|-
! colspan="10" style="background-color:#f2f2f2; cell-border:2px solid black; padding-left: 1em; padding-right: 1em; text-align: center;" |2016 University of Canberra Vikings – NRC
|-
|colspan="10"|The squad for the 2016 National Rugby Championship season:
|-
| width="3%"| 
| width="30%" style="font-size: 95%;" valign="top"|

Props
 Allan Alaalatoa
 Nick Dobson
 Ray Dobson
 Leslie Leulua’iali’i-Makin
 Scott Sio1
 Fa'alelei Sione
 Sione Taula

Hookers
 Robbie Abel
 Joshua Mann-Rea
 Connal McInerney

Locks
 Rory Arnold1
 Sam Carter
 Blake Enever
 Tom Staniforth
 Darcy Swain

| width="3%"| 
| width="30%" style="font-size: 95%;" valign="top"|

Loose forwards
 Jarrad Butler (c)
 OJ Noa
 Dean Oakman-Hunt
 Dan Penca
 Jordan Smiler

Scrum-halves
 Brent Hamlin
 Joe Powell

Fly-halves
 Jordan Jackson-Hope
 Nick Jooste

| width="3%"| 
| width="30%" style="font-size: 95%;" valign="top"|

Centres
 Tevita Kuridrani1
 Jake Rakic
 Andrew Robinson
 Andrew Smith

Wingers
 James Dargaville
 Jamie Kotz
 Eli Sinoti
 Henry Speight1
 Lausii Taliauli
 Edan Campbell-O'Brien

Fullbacks
 Robbie Coleman
 Isaac Thompson

Notes:(c) Team captainBold denotes international capped players at that time1 National player additional to contracted squad
|}

{| class="collapsible collapsed" style=" width: 100%; margin: 0px; border: 1px solid darkgray; border-spacing: 3px;"
|-
! colspan="10" style="background-color:#f2f2f2; cell-border:2px solid black; padding-left: 1em; padding-right: 1em; text-align: center;" |2015 University of Canberra Vikings – NRC
|-
|colspan="10"|The squad for the 2015 National Rugby Championship season:
|-
| width="3%"| 
| width="30%" style="font-size: 95%;" valign="top"|

Props
 Allan Alaalatoa
 Ben Alexander
 Phil Kite
 Tyrel Lomax
 Leslie Leulua’iali’i-Makin
 Sione Taula

Hookers
 Albert Anae
 Robbie Abel
 Connal McInerney

Locks
 Rory Arnold
 Blake Enever
 Gareth Clouston
 Dave McKern

| width="3%"| 
| width="30%" style="font-size: 95%;" valign="top"|

Loose forwards
 Jarrad Butler (c)
 Dean Oakman-Hunt
 Dan Penca
 Rowan Perry
 Jordan Smiler
 Ita Vaea

Scrum-halves
 Joe Powell
 Brent Hamlin

Fly-halves
 Rodney Iona
 Christian Lealiifano1
 Mitch Third

| width="3%"| 
| width="30%" style="font-size: 95%;" valign="top"|

Centres
 Nigel Ah Wong
 James Dargaville
 Francis Fainifo
 Jake Rakic

Wingers
 Jake Knight
 Jerome Nuimata
 Henry Speight1
 Peni Tagive
 Lausii Taliauli
 Joe Tomane1

Fullbacks
 Isaac Thompson
 Aidan Toua

Notes:(c) Team captainBold denotes international capped players at that time1 National player additional to contracted squad
|}

{| class="collapsible collapsed" style=" width: 100%; margin: 0px; border: 1px solid darkgray; border-spacing: 3px;"
|-
! colspan="10" style="background-color:#f2f2f2; cell-border:2px solid black; padding-left: 1em; padding-right: 1em; text-align: center;" |2014 University of Canberra Vikings – NRC
|-
|colspan="10"|The squad for the 2014 National Rugby Championship season:

|-
| width="3%"| 
| width="30%" style="font-size: 95%;" valign="top"|

Props
 Allan Alaalatoa
 Leslie Leulua’iali’i-Makin
 Scott Sio1
 JP Smith
 Ruan Smith
 Sione Taula

Hookers
 Seilala Lam
 Siliva Siliva
 Mitch Wade

Locks
 Sam Carter1
 Gareth Clouston
 Dave McKern
 Tom Staniforth

| width="3%"| 
| width="30%" style="font-size: 95%;" valign="top"|

Loose forwards
 Fotu Auelua (c)
 Jarrad Butler
 Tim Cree
 Sean Doyle
 Rowan Perry
 Jordan Smiler

Scrum-halves
 Michael Dowsett
 Joe Powell

Fly-halves
 Rodney Iona
 Isaac Thompson

| width="3%"| 
| width="30%" style="font-size: 95%;" valign="top"|

Centres
 Nigel Ah Wong
 Matt Hawke
 Jake Rakic
 Christian Lealiifano1
 Pat McCabe1

Wingers
 Henry Speight
 Joe Tomane
 Jerome Nuimata
 Drew Southwell
 Liam Slater

Fullbacks
 Robbie Coleman
 Jesse Mogg
 Brendon Taueki

Notes:(c) Team captainBold denotes international capped players at that time1 National player additional to contracted squad
|}

{| class="collapsible collapsed" style=" width: 100%; margin: 0px; border: 1px solid darkgray; border-spacing: 3px;"
|-
! colspan="10" style="background-color:#f2f2f2; cell-border:2px solid black; padding-left: 1em; padding-right: 1em; text-align: center;" |2007 Canberra Vikings – ARC
|-
| width="3%"| 
| width="30%" style="font-size: 95%;" valign="top"|

Props
 Nic Henderson
 Jack Kennedy
 Pauliasi Tomoepeau
 John Ulugia

Hookers
 Saia Faingaa
 Anthony Hegarty
 Dan Raymond

Locks
 Alister Campbell (c)
 Peter Kimlin
 Leon Power
 Adam Wallace-Harrison

| width="3%"| 
| width="30%" style="font-size: 95%;" valign="top"|

Back row
 Jarred Barry
 Mark Chisholm
 Dan Guinness
 Julian Salvi
 Jone Tawake
 Henry Vanderglas

Halfbacks
 Beau Mokotupu
 Nick Haydon
 Patrick Phibbs

Flyhalves
 Christian Lealiifano

| width="3%"| 
| width="30%" style="font-size: 95%;" valign="top"|

Centres
 Tim Cornforth
 Matthew Carraro
 Anthony Faingaa
 Gene Fairbanks
 Rowan Kellam

Wings
 Francis Fainifo
 Solomona Fainifo
 Eddie Mclaughlin

Fullbacks
 Tim Wright

Notes:(c) Team captainBold denotes international capped players at that time
|}

Gallery

See also

 Brumbies Rugby 
 ACT and Southern NSW Rugby Union
 Rugby union in the Australian Capital Territory
 Canberra Raiders

References

Sources

External links
Canberra Vikings official website

Archives

 

Australian Rugby Championship
National Rugby Championship
Vik
Rugby union teams in the Australian Capital Territory
Rugby clubs established in 1994
1994 establishments in Australia
University of Canberra
Viking Age in popular culture
Rugby union clubs disestablished in 2020
2020 disestablishments in Australia